Ramon Romero Jr. (born November 13, 1973) is a Democratic member of the Texas House of Representatives. He has represented District 90 since 2015. In the 2014 primary election, Romero defeated long-time Democratic representative Lon Burnam.

References

External links
Legislative page
Ramon Romero Jr. at the Texas Tribune

1973 births
Living people
Democratic Party members of the Texas House of Representatives
21st-century American politicians
Politicians from Fort Worth, Texas